The 1932 Turkish Football Championship was the third edition of the competition. İstanbulspor won their first and only championship title by defeating Altınordu 3–0 in the final. For Altınordu it was the club's second appearance in the final, with one more to follow in 1935.

The various regional champions competed in a group stage of five groups of three to six teams each, with the group winners qualifying for the final stage.

Group stage

Eskişehir Group

Round 1

Group final

 Eskişehir Tayyare İdman Yurdu won the group and qualified for the final stage.

Istanbul Group

Round 1

 Bandırma İdman Yurdu received a bye for the group final.

Group final

 İstanbulspor won the group and qualified for the final stage.

İzmir  Group

Round 1

Semi-final

 1 Isparta SK protested against a player of Balıkesir İdman Birliği. As the protest was declined Isparta SK left the field and Balıkesir were awarded the win.
 Altınordu received a bye for the group final.

Group final 

 Altınordu won the group and qualified for the final stage.

Mersin Group

Round 1

Group final

 Konya İdman Yurdu won the group and qualified for the final stage.

Samsun Group

Round 1

 Trabzon İdman Ocağı received a bye for the group final.

Group final

 Trabzon İdman Ocağı won the group and qualified for the final stage.

Final stage

Round 1

 Eskişehir Tayyare İdman Yurdu received a bye for the semi-final.

Semi-final

 Altınordu received a bye for the final.

Final

References

External links
RSSSF

Turkish Football Championship seasons
Turkish
Turkey